A statue of Friedrich Schiller by Max von Widnmann stands in Schiller Park, in Columbus, Ohio's German Village, in the United States.

Description and history
The bronze sculpture is a second cast of the original designed by Widnmann, completed in 1863 and installed in Maximiliansplatz, Munich. The Columbus sculpture was completed in Germany in 1891, transported across the Atlantic Ocean, and erected by the German-Americans of Columbus on July 4. The sculpture was rededicated on July 4, 1991. In 2012, Friends of Schiller Park funded the installation of lights to illuminate the monument.

References

External links

 

1891 establishments in Ohio
1891 sculptures
Bronze sculptures in Ohio
Cultural depictions of Friedrich Schiller
German Village
Monuments and memorials in Ohio
Outdoor sculptures in Columbus, Ohio
Sculptures of men in Ohio
Statues in Columbus, Ohio
Historic district contributing properties in Columbus, Ohio